Buffalo Springfield is a compilation album released on Atco Records in 1973. It is the fifth album by rock band Buffalo Springfield, and their second compilation. It was assembled by the label well after the band had broken up at a time when Crosby, Stills, Nash & Young were quite popular and had not released any new material as a group for over two years, with their 1974 reunion tour eight months away.  It features a nine-minute extended version of the song "Bluebird" by Stephen Stills (consisting of a live jam appended to the studio version), only available elsewhere on the Warner Special Products LP compilation "Heavy Metal – 24 Electrifying Performances" (Volume 2 in the "Superstars of the 70's" series), released in 1974. It has never been issued on compact disc and is currently out of print.

Track listing

Personnel

Musicians
Stephen Stills – vocals, guitars, keyboards, percussion
Neil Young – vocals, guitars, keyboards
Richie Furay – vocals, guitars
Bruce Palmer, Jim Messina – bass
Dewey Martin – drums

Additional personnel
Charlie Chin – banjo on "Bluebird"
Bobby West – bass on "Bluebird"
Don Randi – piano on "Broken Arrow"
Chris Sarns – guitar on "Broken Arrow"
David Crosby – vocal allegedly on "Rock and Roll Woman"
Doug Hastings – guitar on "Rock and Roll Woman"
Jack Nitzsche —musical arrangement on "Expecting to Fly"
James Burton – dobro on "A Child's Claim to Fame"
Richard Davis – bass on "Kind Woman"
Rusty Young – pedal steel guitar on "Kind Woman"
Gary Marker – bass on "I Am a Child"
Buddy Miles – drums on "Special Care"
Jimmy Karstein – drums on "Questions"

Production
Charles Greene, Brian Stone – management and production
Ahmet Ertegun, Richie Furay, Jim Messina, Jack Nitzsche, Stephen Stills, Neil Young – production

Charts

References

1973 compilation albums
Buffalo Springfield compilation albums
Albums produced by Ahmet Ertegun
Albums produced by Jack Nitzsche
Albums produced by Charles Greene (producer)
Albums produced by Brian Stone
Atco Records compilation albums